Yuva Gaurav Award is a literary honour conferred by Gujarat Sahitya Akademi, Government of Gujarat. Established in 2007, the award recognizes and promotes young Gujarati authors.

Recipients

References 

Awards established in 2007
2007 establishments in Gujarat
Gujarati literary awards